Harold Hughes or Henry Harold Hughes (1864–1940) was born in Liverpool and trained as an architect under Arthur Baker in London. He qualified as an ARIBA in 1890 and set up an architectural practice in Bangor in 1892, where he remained until his death in 1940.

Career

Hughes was educated at Liverpool College. Hughes was appointed diocesan surveyor and architect in 1900 and restored many churches in the Diocese of Bangor. In 1919 he formed a partnership with W. G. Williams, who continued the practice after his death in 1940. Hughes was mainly occupied in the restoration of churches. He was a member of the SPAB and only undertook the minimal amount of restoration work. wherever possible. Hughes only appears to have been the architect for one new church, St Cyngar, Borth-y-gest, Porthmadog. His co-operation with the leading Arts and Crafts architect Herbert Luck North in the production of two books, The Old Churches of Snowdonia (1924) and The Old Cottages of Snowdonia (1908/1924) did much to increase public interest in the vernacular architecture of Snowdonia. He also contributed numerous articles to Archaeologia Cambrensis on architectural subjects.

He was interested in archaeology and he joined the Cambrian Archaeological Association in 1892. He was an editor of Archaeologia Cambrensis from 1926 to 1940. He became president of the Cambrian Archaeological Association] in 1930. From its foundation, he was a member of the Council of the National Museum of Wales and of the Commission on Ancient Monuments of Wales from 1935 onwards.

He served as the second President of the North Wales Society of Architects between 1932 and 1933. Herbert Luck North would later serve as the Society's fifth President between 1938 and 1939.

Architectural work, restoration of churches 
St Cwyfan's Church, Llangwyfan, 1891–1893
Bryncroes
Clynnog Fawr
Llanrhychwyn
Llangelynin
Mallwyd
Llaneilan
St Padarn's Church, Llanberis 1914 (enlargement)

Publications (with Herbert Luck North)
The Old Churches of Snowdonia (1924)
The Old Cottages of Snowdonia (1908/1924)

Articles in Archaeologia Cambrensis

1896 – Cochwillan
1898 – Old Houses in Llansilin
1901 – Ynys Seiriol (Puffin Island)
1904 – Survey of Treceiri. 
1905 – Criccieth Castle
1906 – Surveys of Penygaer and Pen-y-corddyn
1908 – Merddyn Gwyn Barrow.
1913 – Harlech Castle
1922 – Prehistoric remains, Penmaenmawr
1922 – Early Christian Art in Anglesey
1924 – Berain
1925 – Pre-Norman Cross in Diserth Church.
1926 – Carving on Maen Achwyfan.
1926 – The lead coffin at Rhyddgaer.
1930 – The Ancient Churches of Anglesey.
1932 – Llanerfyl Reliquary and Reredos.
1938 – The Edwardian Castle and Town Defences of Conway.

Obituaries
Archaeologia Cambrensis (1940), Vol. 95, pp. 85–7.
Antiquaries Journal (1940), Vol. 20, p. 425.

Literature
 Antonia Brodie (ed.) (2001)  Directory of British Architects, 1834–1914: Vol. 1 (A-K), 972–3,  British Architectural Library, Royal Institute of British Architects, London. 
Haslam R., Orbach J. and Voelcker A. (2009), The Buildings of Wales: Gwynedd, Yale University Press, London.  
Voelcker A. (2011), Herbert Luck North: Arts and Crafts architecture for Wales , RCAHMW. .

References

1864 births
1940 deaths
20th-century Welsh architects
20th-century Welsh historians
Welsh archaeologists
Fellows of the Society of Antiquaries of London
Members of the Cambrian Archaeological Association
People from Bangor, Gwynedd
Architects from Liverpool
People educated at Liverpool College
Associates of the Royal Institute of British Architects